Catalina Express (legally Catalina Channel Express) is an American passenger ferry service that operates scheduled trips between Santa Catalina Island and mainland California. The company began service in 1981 with a single sixty-passenger vessel. , the Catalina Express fleet includes eight high-speed vessels that can make the roughly  crossing in about an hour.

History 
The company was started as Catalina Channel Express in 1981 by Doug Bombard with the help of his son Greg and friend Tom Rutter. The trio was looking for a way to bring guests to Two Harbors on the isthmus of the island. They purchased a sport fishing boat called the Check Mate that had operated out of Portland, Oregon. The vessel was refitted with a new enclosed passenger cabin with seats for 55 passengers purchased from Continental Airlines, new engines, a roll-control system, and was re-christened the Catalina Express.

The new vessel was used on a year-round, regular schedule with three round-trips per day. The boat would depart San Pedro at 6 am to get commuters to Avalon by 8, then it would head back to San Pedro, arriving at 9:30. Then the boat would load up hunters and campers and depart for Two Harbors at Noon, and return to San Pedro at 2 pm. Then the boat would make another run to Avalon and back starting at 4:30 pm. The consistent service quickly became popular among island residents. 

After that, the fleet grew rapidly. By 1983, the company added the 149-passenger Avalon Express to the fleet to enable more runs with more passengers. In 1985, the company was able to expand to four vessels with two more 149-passenger boats, the Two Harbors Express and a new Catalina Express, and the original 55-passenger vessel renamed the Channel Express. In 1989, the Super Express joined the fleet, followed by the new Avalon Express in 1990. Also around 1990, Catalina Express opened a new port near the bow of the Queen Mary in Long Beach.

In 1991, the company started its first experiment operating a catamaran, the Jet Cat Express. The 360-passenger vessel could make the crossing in one hour using water jets instead of propellers. However, in 1994, the company made the choice to replace the Jet Cat Express, the Two Harbors Express and the Catalina Express (1985) with the Islander Express and a new Catalina Express, that could make the 32-knot speed necessary to make the crossing in one hour.

In the summer of 1998, Catalina Express added service to Dana Point, and in early 2000 the company moved into the Catalina Landing in Downtown Long Beach, originally built by Crowley Maritime for its Catalina Cruises.

By summer 1999, there was a rivalry brewing between Catalina Cruises and Catalina Express. In May, Catalina Cruises launched the Catalina Jet, a 450-passenger, 36-knot catamaran that made the trip from Long Beach in about 55 minutes. In June, Catalina Express launched the Starship Express, a 300-passenger, 37-knot catamaran that could make the crossing in about 45 to 55 minutes.

Catalina Cruises would cease operations in 2001 and sell the Catalina Jet to Catalina Express.

Operations
Catalina Express operates year-round, and runs up to thirty trips a day in peak season. Transportation is provided to ports at Avalon and Two Harbors on Santa Catalina Island from the mainland California communities of San Pedro, Long Beach and Dana Point. 

Catalina Express transports over one million passengers each year, and has transported over 25 million passengers . 

The most popular port of departure is the Catalina Landing in Downtown Long Beach, which provides the most daily trips. The company's San Pedro terminal underwent renovations in 2012, and is the only port to offer daily service to Two Harbors.

Ports 
Catalina Express operates out of three harbors on the mainland: 

 San Pedro: located at Berth 95 in the Port of Los Angeles
 Long Beach: located at the Catalina Landing, a terminal and office building development on the grounds of the old Navy Landing
 Dana Point: located the offices of Dana Wharf Sportfishing in the Dana Point Harbor

Fleet
The company began with only one vessel that held about 60 passengers. , the company operates eight high-speed vessels.

Related businesses
On April 1, 2016, Greg Bombard (one of the founders of Catalina Express) and his brother Tim, co-founded Avalon Freight Services with Harley Franco, the owner of Harley Marine, a local tug boat company. Avalon Freight Services holds the exclusive contract with the Catalina Island Company to use the dock and warehouse space on the eastern end of the island. The company uses a self-propelled landing craft, the Catalina Provider, along with a tug/ramp barge combination to transport freight between the island and San Pedro.

Catalina Express holds the contract to operate and manage the Aquabus and Aqualink ferry services of Long Beach Transit. The two routes operate around Long Beach Harbor and Alamitos Bay.

See also
 Catalina Flyer, a competing ferry service to Catalina Island from Newport Beach
 List of ferry operators
 List of high-speed craft ferry routes

References

External links
 

Ferries of California
Santa Catalina Island (California)
Transportation in Los Angeles County, California
Transportation in Orange County, California